Cuvry is a commune in the Moselle department in Grand Est in north-eastern France.

See also 
 Communes of the Moselle department

References

External links 
 

Communes of Moselle (department)